Superior is a white-skinned, white-fleshed, mid-season potato variety. It was released by the University of Wisconsin potato breeding program in 1962, and is not under plant variety protection. It is a progeny of a cross between 'B96-56' and 'M59.44' and was first grown in 1951. 'B96-56' was also a parent of Kennebec. Like the potato variety Atlantic, Superior is widely grown for potato chip manufacturing right off the field and marketable yields are fairly high.

Botanical features
 Self-fertile
 Tubers (potatoes) are oval to round with medium-depth eyes.
 Tuber skin is white and may become lightly russeted as it matures.
 Flesh is white and has a high specific gravity.
 The plants are medium height
 Reddish purple stems
 Terminal leaflets are short and ovate
 Primary leaflets are thick and arched
 Flowers have white tips
 Sprouts are dark purple

Agricultural features 
 High yields, it is used for potato chips, but grows best in cool climates. 
 It has moderate resistance to common scab and Verticillium wilt
 It is generally free from defects such as growth cracks, greening, secondary growth, heat necrosis, hollow heart, and vascular discoloration in tubers, but is susceptible to potato virus Y, potato virus X, and late blight.

References 

Potato cultivars